Sarat Kumar Deb was an Indian politician.  He was elected to the Lok Sabha, the lower house of the Parliament of India from Kendrapara, Odisha as a member of the Janata Party.

References

India MPs 1984–1989
Lok Sabha members from Odisha
Janata Party politicians
1988 deaths
Year of birth missing